The 1995 Atlanta Braves season was the 125th season in the history of the franchise and 30th season in the city of Atlanta. The team finished the strike-shortened season with a record of 90–54, the best in the National League, en route to winning the World Series.  For the sixth straight season, the team was managed by Bobby Cox.

The Braves started the season in mediocre fashion, posting a 20–17 record up to June 4, putting them in third place behind the Philadelphia Phillies and the Montreal Expos.  The team went on to win twenty of the last twenty-five games before the All-Star Break to put themselves in first place by four and a half games.  In the second half of the season, the Braves pulled away from the rest of the division by going 11–7 over the rest of July and 19–10 in August. The team went on to win the division by twenty-one games.  The Braves' 90–54 record was second only to the American League's Cleveland Indians, who went 100–44 on the season.

In the postseason, the Braves beat the Colorado Rockies in the NL Division Series three games to one, then swept the Cincinnati Reds four games to zero to win the NL Championship Series.  In the World Series, the Braves beat the Cleveland Indians four games to two, bringing the first World Championship to the city of Atlanta.

Through completion of the 2019 MLB season, the Braves are one of three teams out of nine MLB franchises to have first swept their opponent in the League Championship Series (LCS), and subsequently go onto win the World Series; the other teams were the 2019 Washington Nationals and the 2022 Houston Astros.  This two-decades-long milestone for Atlanta is based upon the (LCS) becoming a best-of-seven (games) format 10 years earlier, in 1985.

Opening Day starter Greg Maddux led the National League in wins (19) and earned run average (1.63) to secure his fourth consecutive Cy Young Award. Marquis Grissom won a Gold Glove for center field, and Greg Maddux won his sixth (of thirteen) consecutive Gold Gloves.

This would be the last World Series title for the Braves until the 2021 season.

Offseason
The Braves 1995 season began without some of the regular contributors of 1994. The team lost Terry Pendleton, Dave Gallagher, and Bill Pecota to free agency. Roberto Kelly and Tony Tarasco were also traded with Esteban Yan to the Montreal Expos for Marquis Grissom.  They signed free agents Mike Sharperson, Dwight Smith, and Mike Stanton.  The Braves five starting pitchers remained the same from 1994.

The Braves would also be playing in the brand–new National League East in 1995. The division was formed through realignment prior to the 1994 Major League Baseball season, but division championships were not awarded in 1994 due to the 1994 strike.  The division includes the Philadelphia Phillies, the Montreal Expos, the Florida Marlins, and the New York Mets.

Regular season

Opening Day starters
SS Jeff Blauser
CF Marquis Grissom
3B Chipper Jones
RF David Justice
LF Mike Kelly
2B Mark Lemke
C Javy López
P Greg Maddux
1B Fred McGriff

Season standings

Record vs. opponents

Game log

|- style="text-align:center;" bgcolor="#bbffbb"
| 1 || April 26 || Giants || 12–5 || Maddux (1–0) || Mulholland (0–1) || || 32,045 || 2:46 || 1–0
|- style="text-align:center;" bgcolor="#bbffbb"
| 2 || April 27 || Giants || 6–4 || Stanton (1–0) || Burba (0–1) || Clontz (1) || 26,120 || 2:42 || 2–0
|- style="text-align:center;" bgcolor="#ffbbbb"
| 3 || April 28 || @ Dodgers || 1–9 || Daal (1–0) || Avery (0–1) || || 51,181 || 3:08 || 2–1
|- style="text-align:center;" bgcolor="bbffbb"
| 4 || April 29 || @ Dodgers || 4–3 || McMichael (1–0) || Murphy (0–1) || || 45,885 || 2:55 || 3–1
|- style="text-align:center;" bgcolor="#bbffbb"
| 5 || April 30 || @ Dodgers || 6–3 || Smoltz (1–0) || Martínez (1–1) || Clontz (2) || 40,785 || 3:00 || 4–1
|-

|- style="text-align:center;" bgcolor="#bbffbb"
| 6 || May 2 || @ Marlins || 7–1 || Maddux (2–0) || Gardner (0–2) || || 23,476 || 3:11 || 5–1
|- style="text-align:center;" bgcolor="#bbffbb"
| 7 || May 3 || @ Marlins || 6–4 || Glavine (1–0) || Witt (0–2) || Clontz (3) || 21,918 || 3:17 || 6–1
|- style="text-align:center;" bgcolor="#bbffbb"
| 8 || May 4 || @ Marlins || 6–3 || Woodall (1–0) || Nen (0–1) || McMichael (1) || 23,550 || 2:24 || 7–1
|- style="text-align:center;" bgcolor="#ffbbbb"
| 9 || May 5 || Phillies || 4–9 || Green (1–1) || Mercker (0–1) || Borland (1) || 33,296 || 2:45 || 7–2
|- style="text-align:center;" bgcolor="#ffbbbb"
| 10 || May 6 || Phillies || 1–3 || Mimbs (1–0) || Smoltz (1–1) || Slocumb (3) || 37,850 || 2:57 || 7–3
|- style="text-align:center;" bgcolor="#ffbbbb"
| 11 || May 7 || Phillies || 4–5 || Schilling (2–0) || Bedrosian (0–1) || Slocumb (4) || 34,166 || 2:30 || 7–4
|- style="text-align:center;" bgcolor="#ffbbbb"
| 12 || May 8 || Phillies || 2–3 || Abbott (1–0) || Glavine (1–1) || Slocumb (5) || 27,266 || 2:57 || 7–5
|- style="text-align:center;" bgcolor="bbffbb"
| 13 || May 9 || @ Mets || 3–2 || McMichael (2–0) || Manzanillo (0–1) || Clontz (4) || 14,882 || 2:21 || 8–5
|- style="text-align:center;" bgcolor="#ffbbbb"
| 14 || May 10 || @ Mets || 2–5 || Henry (1–1) || Wohlers (0–1) || Franco (3) || 12,620 || 2:54 || 8–6
|- style="text-align:center;" bgcolor="#ffbbbb"
| 15 || May 11 || @ Mets || 3–5 || Jones (2–1) || Smoltz (1–2) || Franco (4) || 13,073 || 2:44 || 8–7
|- style="text-align:center;" bgcolor="#ffbbbb"
| 16 || May 12 || Reds || 4–5(11) || Brentley (1–0) || Bedrosian (0–2) || || 33,106 || 2:57 || 8–8
|- style="text-align:center;" bgcolor="#bbffbb"
| 17 || May 13 || Reds || 9–6 || Glavine (2–1) || Smith (0–1) || Borbón (1) || 36,058 || 2:47 || 9–8
|- style="text-align:center;" bgcolor="#ffbbbb"
| 18 || May 14 || Reds || 3–5(10) || Carrasco (1–3) || Clontz (0–1) || || 28,860 || 3:12 || 9–9
|- style="text-align:center;" bgcolor="#bbffbb"
| 19 || May 15 || Rockies || 4–0 || Mercker (1–1) || Olivares (1–2) || || 27,009 || 2:24 || 10–9
|- style="text-align:center;" bgcolor="#bbffbb"
| 20 || May 16 || Rockies || 15–3 || Smoltz (2–2) || Acevedo (2–1) || || 25,516 || 2:35 || 11–9
|- style="text-align:center;" bgcolor="#ffbbbb"
| 21 || May 17 || Rockies || 5–6 || Holmes (3–0) || Maddux (2–1) || Ruffin (6) || 27,070 || 2:41 || 11–10
|- style="text-align:center;" bgcolor="#bbffbb"
| 22 || May 18 || Rockies || 3–2 || McMichael (3–0) || Munoz (1–2) || Borbón (2) || 26,205 || 2:52 || 12–10
|- style="text-align:center;" bgcolor="#bbffbb"
| 23 || May 19 || Marlins || 4–0 || Avery (1–1) || Veres (0–1) || || 30,275 || 2:37 || 13–10
|- style="text-align:center;" bgcolor="#bbffbb"
| 24 || May 20 || Marlins || 8–7 || Wohlers (1–1) || Nen (0–3) || || 38,212 || 3:30 || 14–10
|- style="text-align:center;" bgcolor="#bbffbb"
| 25 || May 21 || Marlins || 5–1 || Smoltz (3–2) || Burkett (3–3) || || 35,141 || 2:39 || 15–10
|- style="text-align:center;" bgcolor="#bbffbb"
| 26 || May 23 || @ Cardinals || 7–1 || Maddux (3–1) || Jackson (0–5) || || 26,758 || 2:37 || 16–10
|- style="text-align:center;" bgcolor="#bbffbb"
| 27 || May 24 || @ Cardinals || 9–5 || Glavine (3–1) || Frascatore (1–1)  || || 20,413 || 2:49 || 17–10
|- style="text-align:center;" bgcolor="#ffbbbb"
| 28 || May 25 || @ Cardinals || 1–4 || Hill (3–0) || Avery (1–2) || Henke (9) || 23,807 || 2:26 || 17–11
|- style="text-align:center;" bgcolor="#bbffbb"
| 29 || May 26 || @ Astros || 8–3 || Mercker (2–1) || Swindell (3–2) || || 26,246 || 3:03 || 18–11
|- style="text-align:center;" bgcolor="#ffbbbb"
| 30 || May 27 || @ Astros || 2–3(10) || Hudek (2–0) || Stanton (1–1) || || 19,257 || 3:03 || 18–12
|- style="text-align:center;" bgcolor="#bbffbb"
| 31 || May 28 || @ Astros || 3–1 || Maddux (4–1) || Kile (1–4)  || || 25,526 || 2:19 || 19–12
|- style="text-align:center;" bgcolor="#bbffbb"
| 32 || May 29 || @ Cubs || 2–1 || Glavine (4–1) || Castillo (3–2) || || 31,654 || 2:29 || 20–12
|- style="text-align:center;" bgcolor="#ffbbbb"
| 33 || May 31 || @ Cubs || 1–4 || Morgan (1–1) || Avery (1–3) || Myers (12) || 27,372 || 2:28 || 20–13
|-

|- style="text-align:center;" bgcolor="#ffbbbb"
| 34 || June 1 || Dodgers || 3–6 || Valdez (1–2) || Mercker (2–2) || || 27,796 || 2:19 || 20–14
|- style="text-align:center;" bgcolor="#ffbbbb"
| 35 || June 2 || Astros || 2–7 || Drabek (2–3) || Smoltz (3–3) || || 30,041 || 2:45 || 20–15
|- style="text-align:center;" bgcolor="#ffbbbb"
| 36 || June 3 || Astros || 1–2(10) || Jones (3–0) || Wohlers (1–2) || Hudek (6) || 41,967 || 2:54 || 20–16
|- style="text-align:center;" bgcolor="#ffbbbb"
| 37 || June 4 || Astros || 2–6 || Reynolds (2–4) || Glavine (4–2) || || 29,507 || 2:46 || 20–17
|- style="text-align:center;" bgcolor="#bbffbb"
| 38 || June 5 || Cubs || 7–5 || Bedrosian (1–2) || Hickerson (0–2) || Wohlers (1) || 27,508 || 2:43 || 21–17
|- style="text-align:center;" bgcolor="#bbffbb"
| 39 || June 6 || Cubs || 17–3 || Mercker (3–2) || Trachsel (2–3) || || 32,402 || 2:48 || 22–17
|- style="text-align:center;" bgcolor="#bbffbb"
| 40 || June 7 || Cubs || 4–3 || Smoltz (4–3) || Perez (0–3) || Wohlers (2) || 30,731 || 2:31 || 23–17
|- style="text-align:center;" bgcolor="#bbffbb"
| 41 || June 9 || Cardinals || 3–2(10) || McMichael (4–0) || Arocha (3–4) || || 33,231 || 2:18 || 24–17
|- style="text-align:center;" bgcolor="#ffbbbb"
| 42 || June 10 || Cardinals || 3–7 || DeLucia (2–3) || Glavine (4–3) || || 44,956 || 2:50 || 24–18
|- style="text-align:center;" bgcolor="#ffbbbb"
| 43 || June 11 || Cardinals || 4–8 || Habyan (2–1) || Avery (1–4) || Henke (12) || 32,515 || 2:45 || 24–19
|- style="text-align:center;" bgcolor="#ffbbbb"
| 44 || June 13 || @ Expos || 2–11 || Pérez (6–1) || Mercker (3–3) || || 25,492 || 3:09 || 24–20
|- style="text-align:center;" bgcolor="#bbffbb"
| 45 || June 14 || @ Expos || 7–3 || Smoltz (5–3) || Fassero (7–3) || || 22,339 || 2:52 || 25–20
|- style="text-align:center;" bgcolor="#bbffbb"
| 46 || June 15 || @ Expos || 2–0 || Maddux (5–1) || Martínez (5–2) || || 25,013 || 2:25 || 26–20
|- style="text-align:center;" bgcolor="#bbffbb"
| 47 || June 16 || @ Rockies || 2–0 || Glavine (5–3) || Swift (1–2) || || 48,163 || 2:21 || 27–20
|- style="text-align:center;" bgcolor="#bbffbb"
| 48 || June 17 || @ Rockies || 7–1 || Avery (2–4) || Acevedo (3–6) || || 50,035 || 2:47 || 28–20
|- style="text-align:center;" bgcolor="#bbffbb"
| 49 || June 18 || @ Rockies || 9–4 || Mercker (4–3) || Freeman (2–4) || || 48,302 || 2:42 || 29–20
|- style="text-align:center;" bgcolor="#bbffbb"
| 50 || June 19 || @ Reds || 10–0 || Smoltz (6–3) || Schourek (4–4) || || 23,262 || 2:37 || 30–20
|- style="text-align:center;" bgcolor="#bbffbb"
| 51 || June 20 || @ Reds || 10–2 || Maddux (6–1) || Nitkowski (0–1) || || 23,418 || 3:14 || 31–20
|- style="text-align:center;" bgcolor="#ffbbbb"
| 52 || June 21 || @ Reds || 1–3 || Smiley (6–1) || Glavine (5–4) || Brantley (10) || 23,571 || 2:22 || 31–21
|- style="text-align:center;" bgcolor="#ffbbbb"
| 53 || June 22 || @ Reds || 8–9 || Hernandez (5–0) || Borbón (0–1) || Brantley (11) || 30,497 || 2:47 || 31–22
|- style="text-align:center;" bgcolor="#ffbbbb"
| 54 || June 23 || Mets || 3–9 || Saberhagen (4–2) || Mercker (4–4) || || 38,000 || 2:17 || 31–23
|- style="text-align:center;" bgcolor="#bbffbb"
| 55 || June 24 || Mets || 5–4 || Smoltz (7–3) || Mlicki (4–4)  || Wohlers (3) || 46,121 || 2:45 || 32–23
|- style="text-align:center;" bgcolor="#bbffbb"
| 56 || June 25 || Mets || 4–2 || Maddux (7–1) || Harnisch (1–5) || Wohlers (4) || 34,120 || 2:39 || 33–23
|- style="text-align:center;" bgcolor="#bbffbb"
| 57 || June 26 || Expos || 4–3 || Glavine (6–4) || Aquino (0–2) || Wohlers (5) || 31,399 || 2:25 || 34–23
|- style="text-align:center;" bgcolor="#ffbbbb"
| 58 || June 27 || Expos || 0–3 || Henry (3–5) || Avery (2–5) || Rojas (12) || 32,916 || 1:56 || 34–24
|- style="text-align:center;" bgcolor="#bbffbb"
| 59 || June 28 || Expos || 4–3 || Clontz (1–1) || Rojas (1–2) || || 37,676 || 2:25 || 35–24
|- style="text-align:center;" bgcolor="#ffbbbb"
| 60 || June 30 || @ Phillies || 1–3 || Green (8–4) || Smoltz (7–4) || Slocumb (20) || 32,821 || 2:40 || 35–25
|-

|- style="text-align:center;" bgcolor="#bbffbb"
| 61 || July 1 || @ Phillies || 3–1 || Maddux (7–1) || West (2–2) || || 33,375 || 2:25 || 36–25
|- style="text-align:center;" bgcolor="#bbffbb"
| 62 || July 2 || @ Phillies || 5–3 || Glavine (7–4) || Mimbs (6–3) || Wohlers (6) || 35,648 || 2:44 || 37–25
|- style="text-align:center;" bgcolor="#bbffbb"
| 63 || July 3 || @ Phillies || 10–4 || Avery (3–5) || Schilling (5–4) || || 59,203 || 2:55 || 38–25
|- style="text-align:center;" bgcolor="#bbffbb"
| 64 || July 4 || Dodgers || 3–2 || Clontz (2–1) || Valdez (3–8) || Wohlers (7) || 49,104 || 2:26 || 39–25
|- style="text-align:center;" bgcolor="#bbffbb"
| 65 || July 5 || Dodgers || 4–1 || Wohlers (2–2) || Astacio (1–7) || || 36,922 || 3:01 || 40–25
|- style="text-align:center;" bgcolor="#bbffbb"
| 66 || July 6 || Dodgers || 1–0 || McMichael (5–0) || Seánez (1–2) || || 38,497 || 2:16 || 41–25
|- style="text-align:center;" bgcolor="#bbffbb"
| 67 || July 7 || Giants || 8–4 || Glavine (8–4) || Greer (0–1) || || 39,482 || 2:46 || 42–25
|- style="text-align:center;" bgcolor="#bbffbb"
| 68 || July 8 || Giants || 9–4 || Avery (4–5) || Portugal (5–3) || || 49,056 || 2:17 || 43–25
|- style="text-align:center;" bgcolor="#bbffbb"
| 69 || July 9 || Giants || 3–2 || Wohlers (3–2) || Beck (4–3) || || 37,741 || 2:33 || 44–25
|- style="text-align:center;" bgcolor="#f0e68c"
| – || July 11 || colspan='8'|1995 Major League Baseball All-Star Game in Arlington, Texas
|- style="text-align:center;" bgcolor="#ffbbbb"
| 70 || July 12 || @ Pirates || 1–2 || Parris (2–2) || Smoltz (7–5) || Miceli (11) || 9,123 || 2:13 || 44–26
|- style="text-align:center;" bgcolor="#bbffbb"
| 71 || July 13 || @ Padres || 4–1 || Maddux (9–1) || Hamilton (3–3) || || 15,028 || 2:22 || 45–26
|- style="text-align:center;" bgcolor="#bbffbb"
| 72 || July 14 || @ Padres || 6–2 || Glavine (9–4) || Benes (3–6) || || 17,027 || 2:17 || 46–26
|- style="text-align:center;" bgcolor="#bbffbb"
| 73 || July 15 || @ Padres || 7–6 || Clontz (3–1) || Florie (2–1) || Wohlers (8) || 39,737 || 2:49 || 47–26
|- style="text-align:center;" bgcolor="#ffbbbb"
| 74 || July 16 || @ Padres || 1–3 || Dishman (2–2) || Mercker (4–5) || Hoffman (12) || 23,925 || 2:49 || 47–27
|- style="text-align:center;" bgcolor="#ffbbbb"
| 75 || July 18 || Pirates || 4–5(10) || Dyer (3–1) || Wohlers (3–3) || Miceli (14) || 33,940 || 3:24 || 47–28
|- style="text-align:center;" bgcolor="#bbffbb"
| 76 || July 19 || Pirates || 3–2 || Maddux (10–1) || Loaiza (6–5) || Wohlers (9) || 35,736 || 2:20 || 48–28
|- style="text-align:center;" bgcolor="#bbffbb"
| 77 || July 20 || Pirates || 4–3 || Clontz (4–1) || Plesac (3–1) || || 31,661 || 2:30 || 49–28
|- style="text-align:center;" bgcolor="#ffbbbb"
| 78 || July 21 || Padres || 6–9 || Bochtler (1–0) || McMichael (5–1) || Hoffman (14) || 39,888 || 3:33 || 49–29
|- style="text-align:center;" bgcolor="#bbffbb"
| 79 || July 22 || Padres || 3–2 || Wohlers (4–3) || Blair (2–1) || || 48,827 || 2:29 || 50–29
|- style="text-align:center;" bgcolor="#bbffbb"
| 80 || July 23 || Padres || 2–1 || Smoltz (8–5) || Hamilton (3–5) || Wohlers (10) || 37,109 || 2:14 || 51–29
|- style="text-align:center;" bgcolor="#bbffbb"
| 81 || July 24 || @ Pirates || 3–2 || Clontz (5–1) || Plesac (3–2) || Wohlers (11) || 16,142 || 2:55 || 52–29
|- style="text-align:center;" bgcolor="#bbffbb"
| 82 || July 25 || @ Pirates || 3–1(10) || Clontz (6–1) || Gott (1–3) || Stanton (1) || 13,864 || 3:51 || 53–29
|- style="text-align:center;" bgcolor="#ffbbbb"
| 83 || July 26 || @ Dodgers || 0–1 || Valdez (7–6) || Avery (4–6) || Worrell (17) || 37,491 || 2:19 || 53–30
|- style="text-align:center;" bgcolor="#ffbbbb"
| 84 || July 27 || @ Dodgers || 4–9 || Cummings (1–0) || Mercker (4–6) || || 36,942 || 2:37 || 53–31
|- style="text-align:center;" bgcolor="#bbffbb"
| 85 || July 28 || @ Giants || 6–2 || Clontz (7–1) || Beck (4–5) || || 21,090 || 2:12 || 54–31
|- style="text-align:center;" bgcolor="#bbffbb"
| 86 || July 29 || @ Giants || 5–1 || Maddux (11–1) || Mulholland (2–10) || || 21,772 || 2:09 || 55–31
|- style="text-align:center;" bgcolor="#ffbbbb"
| 87 || July 30 || @ Giants || 2–3 || Brewington (2–0) || Glavine (9–5) || Beck (17) || 32,154 || 2:38 || 55–32
|-

|- style="text-align:center;" bgcolor="#ffbbbb"
| 88 || August 1 || Phillies || 3–4 || Fernandez (2–5) || Avery (4–7) || Slocumb (25) || 38,579 || 3:05 || 55–33
|- style="text-align:center;" bgcolor="#bbffbb"
| 89 || August 2 || Phillies || 7–5 || Mercker (5–6) || Muñoz (0–2) || Wohlers (12) || 35,594 || 2:56 || 56–33
|- style="text-align:center;" bgcolor="#bbffbb"
| 90 || August 3 || Phillies || 5–4 || Borbón (1–1) || Slocumb (2–2) || || 37,971 || 2:24 || 57–33
|- style="text-align:center;" bgcolor="#bbffbb"
| 91 || August 4 || @ Expos || 4–3 || Maddux (12–1) || Martínez (9–7) || Wohlers (13) || 20,184 || 2:20 || 58–33
|- style="text-align:center;" bgcolor="#bbffbb"
| 92 || August 5 || @ Expos || 9–6 || Glavine (10–5) || Henry (6–9) || Wohlers (14) || 24,448 || 3:31 || 59–33
|- style="text-align:center;" bgcolor="#ffbbbb"
| 93 || August 6 || @ Expos || 2–6 || Pérez (10–3) || Avery (4–8) || || 26,257 || 2:10 || 59–34
|- style="text-align:center;" bgcolor="#bbffbb"
| 94 || August 7 || @ Expos || 5–1 || Mercker (6–6) || Fassero (10–9) || || 19,480 || 2:43 || 60–34
|- style="text-align:center;" bgcolor="#bbffbb"
| 95 || August 8 || Reds || 5–4 || Smoltz (9–5) || McElroy (3–3) || Wohlers (15) || 38,252 || 2:29 || 61–34
|- style="text-align:center;" bgcolor="#ffbbbb"
| 96 || August 9 || Reds || 3–9 || Burba (6–2) || Maddux (12–2) || Brantley (24) || 38,602 || 2:55 || 61–35
|- style="text-align:center;" bgcolor="#bbffbb"
| 97 || August 10 || Reds || 2–1 || Wohlers (5–3) || Carrasco (2–4) || || 42,748 || 2:24 || 62–35
|- style="text-align:center;" bgcolor="#bbffbb"
| 98 || August 11 || Rockies || 5–3 || Avery (5–8) || Reynoso (4–4) || Wohlers (16) || 47,408 || 1:56 || 63–35
|- style="text-align:center;" bgcolor="#ffbbbb"
| 99 || August 12 || Rockies || 4–16 || Leskanic (4–1) || Mercker (6–7) || || 48,777 || 3:03 || 63–36
|- style="text-align:center;" bgcolor="#bbffbb"
| 100 || August 13 || Rockies || 3–2 || Wohlers (6–3) || Holmes (5–1) || || 43,279 || 2:42 || 64–36
|- style="text-align:center;" bgcolor="#bbffbb"
| 101 || August 14 || Marlins  || 4–3 || McMichael (6–1) || Pérez (1–4) || || 34,375 || 2:30 || 65–36
|- style="text-align:center;" bgcolor="#bbffbb"
| 102 || August 15 || Marlins  || 4–1 || Glavine (11–5) || Banks (0–4) || Wohlers (17) || 30,939 || 2:22 || 66–36
|- style="text-align:center;" bgcolor="#ffbbbb"
| 103 || August 16 || Marlins || 5–8 || Rapp (7–7) || Avery (5–9) || Nen (15)|| 35,244 || 2:41 || 66–37
|- style="text-align:center;" bgcolor="#ffbbbb"
| 104 || August 18 || @ Cardinals || 3–4 || Watson (5–4) || Mercker (6–8) || Henke (25) || 32,027 || 2:36 || 66–38
|- style="text-align:center;" bgcolor="#ffbbbb"
| 105 || August 19 || @ Cardinals || 4–5 || Urbani (3–4) || Murray (0–1) || Henke (26) || 35,475 || 2:38 || 66–39
|- style="text-align:center;" bgcolor="#bbffbb"
| 106 || August 20 || @ Cardinals || 1–0 || Maddux (13–2) || Morgan (4–7) || || 24,613 || 1:50 || 67–39
|- style="text-align:center;" bgcolor="#bbffbb"
| 107 || August 21 || @ Astros || 5–4 || Glavine (12–5) || McMurtry (0–1) || Wohlers (18) || 15,291 || 2:59 || 68–39
|- style="text-align:center;" bgcolor="#bbffbb"
| 108 || August 22 || @ Astros || 6–4 || Avery (6–9) || Brocail (4–2) || Wohlers (19) || 14,799 || 2:52 || 69–39
|- style="text-align:center;" bgcolor="#bbffbb"
| 109 || August 23 || @ Astros || 6–2 || Mercker (7–8) || Hampton (8–6) || || 21,112 || 2:46 || 70–39
|- style="text-align:center;" bgcolor="#bbffbb"
| 110 || August 25 || @ Cubs || 7–3 || Smoltz (10–5) || Castillo (8–7) || || 31,419 || 2:50 || 71–39
|- style="text-align:center;" bgcolor="#bbffbb"
| 111 || August 26 || @ Cubs || 7–2 || Maddux (14–2) || Trachsel (5–10) || || 39,775 || 2:25 || 72–39
|- style="text-align:center;" bgcolor="#bbffbb"
| 112 || August 27 || @ Cubs || 3–1 || Glavine (13–5) || Bullinger (10–5) || Wohlers (20) || 36,401 || 2:50 || 73–39
|- style="text-align:center;" bgcolor="#ffbbbb"
| 113 || August 28 || @ Cubs || 5–7 || Navarro (12–5) || Avery (6–10) || Myers (30) || 17,072 || 2:45 || 73–40
|- style="text-align:center;" bgcolor="#ffbbbb"
| 114 || August 29 || Astros || 9–11(13) || Swindell (8–9) || Murray (0–2) || || 29,777 || 4:23 || 73–41
|- style="text-align:center;" bgcolor="#ffbbbb"
| 115 || August 30 || Astros || 0–2 || Reynolds (9–9) || Smoltz (10–6) || Jones (13) || 29,671 || 2:34 || 73–42
|- style="text-align:center;" bgcolor="#bbffbb"
| 116 || August 31 || Astros || 5–2 || Maddux (15–2) || Drabek (7–8) || || 31,274 || 2:28 || 74–42
|-

|-  style="text-align:center;" bgcolor="#ffbbbb"
| 117 || September 1 || Cubs || 5–7 || Bullinger (11–5) || Glavine (13–6) || Myers (31) || 36,424 || 2:59 || 74–43
|-  style="text-align:center;" bgcolor="#ffbbbb"
| 118 || September 2 || Cubs || 4–6 || Navarro (13–5) || Avery (6–11) || Myers (32) || 49,016 || 2:47 || 74–44
|-  style="text-align:center;" bgcolor="#bbffbb"
| 119 || September 3 || Cubs || 2–0 || Schmidt (1–0) || Foster (9–10) || Wohlers (21) || 42,820 || 2:17 || 75–44
|-  style="text-align:center;" bgcolor="#bbffbb"
| 120 || September 4 || Cardinals || 6–5 || Wohlers (7–3) || Parrett (3–6) || || 29,849 || 2:42 || 76–44
|-  style="text-align:center;" bgcolor="#bbffbb"
| 121 || September 5 || Cardinals || 1–0 || Maddux (16–2) || Urbani (3–5) || || 27,072 || 1:57 || 77–44
|-  style="text-align:center;" bgcolor="#bbffbb"
| 122 || September 6 || Cardinals || 6–1 || Glavine (14–6) || Petkovsek (5–5) || || 29,811 || 2:39 || 78–44
|-  style="text-align:center;" bgcolor="#ffbbbb"
| 123 || September 7 || @ Marlins || 1–5 || Rapp (10–7) || Avery (6–12) || || 20,788 || 1:54 || 78–45
|-  style="text-align:center;" bgcolor="#bbffbb"
| 124 || September 8 || @ Marlins || 6–5 || McMichael (7–1) || Pérez (1–6) || Wohlers (22) || 21,897 || 3:01 || 79–45
|-  style="text-align:center;" bgcolor="#bbffbb"
| 125 || September 9 || @ Marlins || 9–5 || Clontz (8–1) || Nen (0–6) || Wohlers (23) || 32,644 || 3:08 || 80–45
|-  style="text-align:center;" bgcolor="#ffbbbb"
| 126 || September 10 || @ Marlins || 4–5(11) || Mathews (4–3) || Borbón (1–2) || || 24,874 || 3:36 || 80–46
|-  style="text-align:center;" bgcolor="#ffbbbb"
| 127 || September 11 || @ Rockies || 4–5(12) || Hickerson (3–3) || Woodall (1–1) || || 48,056 || 3:35 || 80–47
|-  style="text-align:center;" bgcolor="#ffbbbb"
| 128 || September 12 || @ Rockies || 2–12 || Painter (2–0) || Avery (6–13) || Ritz (2) || 48,013 || 2:14 || 80–48
|-  style="text-align:center;" bgcolor="#bbffbb"
| 129 || September 13 || @ Rockies || 9–7 || Schmidt (2–0) || Bailey (7–6) || || 48,011 || 3:12 || 81–48
|-  style="text-align:center;" bgcolor="#bbffbb"
| 130 || September 15 || @ Reds || 3–1 || Smoltz (11–6) || McElroy (3–4) || McMichael (2) || 31,882 || 2:22 || 82–48
|-  style="text-align:center;" bgcolor="#bbffbb"
| 131 || September 16 || @ Reds || 6–1 || Maddux (17–2) || Portugal (9–10) || || 37,821 || 2:45 || 83–48
|-  style="text-align:center;" bgcolor="#bbffbb"
| 132 || September 17 || @ Reds || 4–1 || Glavine (15–6) || Smiley (12–4) || Wohlers (24) || 19,797 || 2:29 || 84–48
|-  style="text-align:center;" bgcolor="#bbffbb"
| 133 || September 18 || Mets || 7–1 || Avery (7–13) || Jones (9–9) || || 29,635 || 2:03 || 85–48
|-  style="text-align:center;" bgcolor="#ffbbbb"
| 134 || September 19 || Mets || 3–10 || Mlicki (9–6) || Schmidt (2–1) || || 28,837 || 2:46 || 85–49
|-  style="text-align:center;" bgcolor="#ffbbbb"
| 135 || September 20 || Mets || 4–8 || Isringhausen (8–2) || Smoltz (11–7) || Franco (26) || 29,506 || 3:05 || 85–50
|-  style="text-align:center;" bgcolor="#bbffbb"
| 136 || September 21 || Mets || 3–0 || Maddux (18–2) || Telgheder (1–2) || Wohlers (25) || 29,982 || 1:57 || 86–50
|-  style="text-align:center;" bgcolor="#bbffbb"
| 137 || September 22 || Expos || 5–1 || Glavine (12–11) || Pérez (10–8) || || 43,547 || 2:36 || 87–50
|-  style="text-align:center;" bgcolor="#ffbbbb"
| 138 || September 23 || Expos || 2–5 || Martínez (14–9) || McMichael (7–2) || Rojas (29) || 48,998 || 2:29 || 87–51
|- style="text-align:center;" bgcolor="#bbffbb"
| 139 || September 24 || Expos || 5–4(10) || Borbón (2–2) || Leiper (1–3) || || 45,461 || 3:00 || 88–51
|- style="text-align:center;" bgcolor="#bbffbb"
| 140 || September 26 || @ Phillies || 5–1 || Smoltz (12–7) || Quantrill (11–11) || || 21,476 || 2:24 || 89–51
|- style="text-align:center;" bgcolor="#bbffbb"
| 141 || September 27 || @ Phillies || 6–0 || Maddux (19–2) || Mimbs (9–7) || || 26,636 || 2:19 || 90–51
|- style="text-align:center;" bgcolor="#ffbbbb"
| 142 || September 29 || @ Mets || 3–6 || Jones (10–10) || Glavine (16–7) || Franco (28) || 16,007 || 2:23 || 90–52
|- style="text-align:center;"  bgcolor="#ffbbbb"
| 143 || September 30 || @ Mets || 4–8 || Minor (4–2) || Schmidt (2–2) || Franco (29) || 21,659 || 3:03 || 90–53
|-

|- style="text-align:center;" bgcolor="#ffbbbb"
| 144 || October 1 || @ Mets || 0–1(11) || Walker (1–0) || Wade (0–1) || || 18,876 || 2:42 || 90–54
|-

Notable transactions
 April 6, 1995: Roberto Kelly was traded by the Atlanta Braves with Tony Tarasco and Esteban Yan to the Montreal Expos for outfielder Marquis Grissom.
April 12, 1995: Pitcher Mike Stanton signed up as a free agent with the Atlanta Braves.
 July 31, 1995: Mike Stanton was traded by the Atlanta Braves along with a player to be named later to the Boston Red Sox for players to be named later. The Atlanta Braves sent Matt Murray (on August 31, 1995) to the Boston Red Sox to complete the trade. The Boston Red Sox sent Mike Jacobs (minors) (on August 31, 1995) and Marc Lewis (minors) (August 31, 1995) to the Atlanta Braves to complete the trade.
 August 11, 1995: Luis Polonia was traded by the New York Yankees to the Atlanta Braves for Troy Hughes (minors).
 August 25, 1995: Mike Devereaux was traded by the Chicago White Sox to the Atlanta Braves for Andre King (minors).

Postseason

|- style="text-align:center;" bgcolor="#bbffbb"
| 1 || October 3 || @ Rockies || 5–4 || Peña (1–0) || Leskanic (0–1) || Wohlers (1) || 50,040 || 3:19 || 1–0
|- style="text-align:center;" bgcolor="#bbffbb"
| 2 || October 4 || @ Rockies || 7–4 || Peña (2–0) || Munoz (0–1) || Wohlers (2) || 50,063 || 3:08 || 2–0
|- style="text-align:center;" bgcolor="#ffbbbb"
| 3 || October 6 || Rockies || 5–7(10) || Holmes (1–0) || Wohlers (0–1) || Thompson (1) || 51,300 || 3:16 || 2–1
|- style="text-align:center;" bgcolor="bbffbb"
| 4 || October 7 || Rockies || 10–4 || Maddux (1–0) || Saberhagen (0–1) || || 50,027 || 2:38 || 3–1
|-

|- style="text-align:center;" bgcolor="#bbffbb"
| 1 || October 10 || @ Reds || 2–1(11) || Wohlers (1–0) || Jackson (0–1) || McMichael (1) || 40,382 || 3:18 || 1–0
|- style="text-align:center;" bgcolor="#bbffbb"
| 2 || October 11 || @ Reds || 6–2(10) || McMichael (1–0) || Portugal (0–1) || || 44,624 || 3:26 || 2–0
|- style="text-align:center;" bgcolor="bbffbb"
| 3 || October 13 || Reds || 5–2 || Maddux (1–0) || Wells (0–1) || Wohlers (1) || 51,424 || 2:42 || 3–0
|- style="text-align:center;" bgcolor="#bbffbb"
| 4 || October 14 || Reds || 6–0 || Avery (1–0) || Schourek (0–1) || || 52,067 || 2:54 || 4–0
|-

|- style="text-align:center;" bgcolor="#bbffbb"
| 1 || October 21 || Indians || 3–2 || Maddux (1–0) || Hershiser (0–1) || || 51,876 || 2:37 || 1–0
|- style="text-align:center;" bgcolor="#bbffbb"
| 2 || October 22 || Indians || 4–3 || Glavine (1–0) || Martínez (0–1) || Wohlers (1) || 51,877 || 3:17 || 2–0
|- style="text-align:center;" bgcolor="ffbbbb"
| 3 || October 24 || @ Indians || 6–7(11) || Mesa (1–0) || Peña (0–1) || || 43,584 || 4:09 || 2–1
|- style="text-align:center;" bgcolor="#bbffbb"
| 4 || October 25 || @ Indians || 5–2 || Avery (1–0) || Hill (0–1) || Borbón (1) || 43,578 || 3:14 || 3–1
|- style="text-align:center;" bgcolor="#ffbbbb"
| 5 || October 26 || @ Indians || 4–5 || Hershiser (1–1) || Maddux (1–1) || Mesa (1) || 43,595 || 2:33 || 3–2
|- style="text-align:center;" bgcolor="#bbffbb"
| 6 || October 28 || Indians || 1–0 || Glavine (2–0) || Poole (0–1) || Wohlers (2) || 51,875 || 3:01 || 4–2
|-

National League Division Series

Atlanta wins series, 3-1

National League Championship Series

Atlanta wins series, 4-0

World Series

Game 1
October 21, 1995, at Atlanta–Fulton County Stadium in Atlanta

Game 2
October 22, 1995, at Atlanta–Fulton County Stadium in Atlanta

Game 3
October 24, 1995, at Jacobs Field in Cleveland, Ohio

Game 4
October 25, 1995, at Jacobs Field in Cleveland, Ohio

Game 5
October 26, 1995, at Jacobs Field in Cleveland, Ohio

Game 6
October 28, 1995, at Atlanta–Fulton County Stadium in Atlanta

Roster

Player stats

Batting

Regular starters 
Note: POS = Position; G = Games played; AB = At bats; R = Runs; H = Hits; 2B = Doubles; HR = Home runs; RBI = Runs batted in; BB = Base on balls; SO = Strikeouts; Avg. = Batting average; OBP = On base percentage; SLG = Slugging percentage

Other batters
Note: POS = Position; G = Games played; AB = At bats; R = Runs; H = Hits; 2B = Doubles; HR = Home runs; RBI = Runs batted in; BB = Base on balls; SO = Strikeouts; Avg. = Batting average; OBP = On base percentage; SLG = Slugging percentage

Pitching

Starting pitchers
Note: W = Wins; L = Losses; ERA = Earned run average; G = Games; GS = Games started; SV = Saves; CG = Complete games; SHO = Shutouts; IP = Innings pitched; BB = Base on balls; SO = Strikeouts

Relief and other pitchers
Note: W = Wins; L = Losses; ERA = Earned run average; G = Games; GS = Games started; SV = Saves; CG = Complete games; SHO = Shutouts; IP = Innings pitched; BB = Base on balls; SO = Strikeouts

Award winners
 Mike Devereaux, OF, NLCS Most Valuable Player
 Tom Glavine, P, Babe Ruth Award
 Tom Glavine, P, Silver Slugger
 Tom Glavine, P, World Series Most Valuable Player
 Marquis Grissom, OF, Gold Glove
 Greg Maddux, P, Gold Glove
 Greg Maddux, P, National League Cy Young Award
 Greg Maddux, P, Pitcher of the Month, July
 Greg Maddux, Sporting News Pitcher of the Year Award

1995 Major League Baseball All-Star Game
 Fred McGriff, 1B, starter
 Greg Maddux, P, reserve

Farm system

References

 1995 Atlanta Braves team at Baseball-Reference
 Atlanta Braves on Baseball Almanac

Atlanta Braves seasons
National League East champion seasons
National League champion seasons
Atlanta Braves season
World Series champion seasons
Atlanta